The Second Presbyterian Church is a historic Presbyterian church located at 460 E. Main Street in Lexington, Kentucky. Construction began on the church in 1922, and it was dedicated in 1924; it was the third building used by its congregation, which was founded in the 1810s. Architects Cram & Ferguson designed the Gothic Revival church; Frankel & Curtis are also associated with the building. The church's main entrance features multiple gabled buttresses, a balcony under a large arched window, and a gable at its peak. On the west side of the church, a buttressed tower rises from the roof to a steep spire.

The church was added to the National Register of Historic Places in 1980.

External links
Second Presbyterian website

References

Presbyterian churches in Kentucky
National Register of Historic Places in Lexington, Kentucky
Churches completed in 1922
20th-century Presbyterian church buildings in the United States
Ralph Adams Cram church buildings
Churches in Lexington, Kentucky
Gothic Revival church buildings in Kentucky
1922 establishments in Kentucky